Independent Party of Sine Saloum was a political party in Sine-Saloum, Senegal. It existed around 1960.

Sources
Nzouankeu, Jacques Mariel. Les partis politiques sénégalais. Dakar: Editions Clairafrique, 1984.

Political parties in Senegal